The men's welterweight is a competition featured at the 2017 World Taekwondo Championships, and was held at the Taekwondowon in Muju County, South Korea on June 30. Welterweights were limited to a maximum of 80 kilograms in body mass.

Medalists

Results
Legend
DQ — Won by disqualification
P — Won by punitive declaration
R — Won by referee stop contest

Finals

Top half

Section 1

Section 2

Section 3

Section 4

Bottom half

Section 5

Section 6

Section 7

Section 8

References
Draw

External links
Official website

Men's 80